W. L. Zorn Arena, more commonly known as Zorn Arena, is an arena located on the campus of UW-Eau Claire in Eau Claire, WI.  The facility is home to the UW-Eau Claire Blugold Men's & Women's Basketball teams, UW-Eau Claire commencement ceremonies and other events (concerts, visiting artists and lecturers). As the home for men's and women's intercollegiate basketball, Zorn Arena seats nearly 2,500, with a total seating capacity with floor seating of 3,300.

The facility is named for Willis "Bill" L. Zorn, UW-Eau Claire's former dean of men, director of athletics and head basketball coach.  Zorn Arena is part of a larger complex that includes three adjoining facilities: Zorn Arena, C.J. Brewer Hall, the Earl S. Kjer Theatre.

References

External links
 
 UW-Eau Claire Athletics page

Buildings and structures in Eau Claire, Wisconsin
College basketball venues in the United States
Basketball venues in Wisconsin
Sports in Eau Claire, Wisconsin
University of Wisconsin–Eau Claire
1952 establishments in Wisconsin
Sports venues completed in 1952